Tianyuan man are the remains of one of the earliest modern humans to inhabit East Asia.  In 2007, researchers found 34 bone fragments belonging to a single individual at the Tianyuan Cave near Beijing, China. Radiocarbon dating shows the bones to be between 42,000 and 39,000 years old, which may be slightly younger than the only other finds of bones of a similar age at the Niah Caves in Sarawak on the South-east Asian island of Borneo.

Isotope analysis suggests that a substantial part of the diet of these individuals came from freshwater fish.

Tianyuan man is considered an early modern homo sapiens. He lacks several mandibular features common among Western or Southern Eurasian late archaic humans, showing its divergence. Based on the rate of dental occlusal attrition, it is estimated he died in his 40s or 50s.

DNA tests published in 2013 revealed that Tianyuan man is related "to many present-day Asians and Native Americans". He had also clearly diverged genetically from the ancestors of modern Europeans or Aboriginal Australians. He belonged to mitochondrial DNA haplogroup B, and his Y-chromosomal haplogroup was K2b.

Tianyuan man exhibits a unique genetic affinity for GoyetQ116-1 from the Goyet Caves in Namur province, Belgium that is not found in any other ancient individual from West Eurasia. He shares more alleles with today's people from the Surui and Karitiana tribes in Brazil than other Native American populations, suggesting a population related to Tianyuan man was once widespread in eastern Asia.

Two studies from 2021 concluded that distinctive East Asian ancestry originated in Mainland Southeast Asia at ~50,000 BCE after diverging from a common East Eurasian source population (also known as "eastern non-Africans" in population genomics), and expanded through multiple migration waves southwards and northwards respectively. The Tianyuan man belonged to such an East Asian-related population which expanded northwards from Southeast Asia and is Basal to modern East Asians as well as Native Americans.

A review article by population geneticist and historian Prof. Melinda A. Yang (2022) concluded that the "East- and Southeast Asian lineage" (ESEA) trifurcated from an East Eurasian source population, and expanded from Mainland Southeast Asia, giving rise to all modern East and Southeast Asian peoples, Indigenous peoples of Siberia, and Indigenous peoples of the Americas, as well as the ancient Hoabinhians and the Tianyuan lineage, which all can be differentiated from the Australasian (AA) or Ancient Ancestral South Indian (AASI) branches of the wider East Eurasian meta-population.

References

External links
 Tianyuan, mtDNA B and the formation of Far Eastern peoples
 

Upper Paleolithic Homo sapiens fossils
Peopling of East Asia